The Office of Mayor of Winchester is the second oldest mayoralty in England, dating back to the period when Winchester was the capital of Wessex and England. The Mayor of Winchester thus stands second only to the Lord Mayor of the City of London in the order of precedence of civic heads.

Winchester is one of just five local authorities in England to have an official residence for its Mayor. Abbey House was built in about 1700 and sited in the Abbey Gardens just off The Broadway in Winchester. It was acquired by the City Council in 1889. The house stands on the site of a monastic establishment known as Nunnaminster and later as St Mary's Abbey, which was founded around AD900 by Alfred's Queen Ealhswith. The Abbey survived until the late 1530s when it was formally surrendered to the Crown as part of the Dissolution of the Monasteries.

History

The exact date of the conferment of full mayoral rights is not known, since the original charter cannot be traced. When London petitioned the King for a grant of mayoralty in 1190, Winchester was not cited as precedent (as were certain French cities), but by 1200 there was reference to the mayoralty as an existing office. It is, therefore, safe to say that the office dates back to the 1190s. The incumbent for 2020-21 is described as the town's 821st mayor.

The earliest Mayors sometimes held the office for several years in succession, but from the 13th century to the present day, the Mayor has been chosen annually. Until the 16th century, the Mayor-elect was required to travel to Westminster to receive the royal assent.

Mayors of Winchester
1403: Mark le Fayre 
1482–1483, 1490–1491, 1499–1500: John Stratford (mayor)
1772–1773: Sir Paulet St John, 1st Baronet
1786–: (Sir) William Hillman (Clerk of the Green Cloth)
1802–1803: George William Chard, Mus Doc (also Organist of Winchester Cathedral)
1808–1809: Sir Henry St John-Mildmay, 4th Baronet

There is a list of all Winchester's Mayors from 1587 to 1912 in the last few pages of Warren's 1913 Winchester directory in this link: http://specialcollections.le.ac.uk/digital/collection/p16445coll4/id/173816/rec/12

There is also a list of all Winchester's Mayors from 1184 to 1799 in pages 266 to 270 of volume 2 of the 1798 first edition of Rev John Milner's history of Winchester in the link below. That list is not considered to be reliable for the period pre 1200: https://babel.hathitrust.org/cgi/pt?id=osu.32435029997897&view=2up&seq=788&size=125&q1=de%20lunn

The following is a list of every person to have held the office of Mayor of Winchester since 1900:
1900–1901: Alfred Bowker
1901–1902: Bertram D Cancellor 
1902–1903: James A. Fort (Liberal Unionist)
1903–1904: George Ward
1904–1905: Frederick Seymour Morgan
1905–1906: Chaloner Shenton
1906–1907: Reginald Harris
1907–1908: William Forder
1908–1909: Frederick King
1909–1910: Harold Stratton
1910–1911: John Furley
1911–1912: Frederick Holdaway
1912–1913: Howard Elkington
1913–1914: Harry Sealey
1914–1919: Alfred Edmeades
1919–1921: Arthur Dyer
1921–1922: Stanley Clifton
1922–1924: Herbert Vacher
1924–1925: Henry Johnson
1925–1926: William Hayward
1926–1928: Frederick Manley
1928–1929: William Symes
1929–1930: Harry Collis
1930–1931: Walter Hamblin
1931–1932: William Lansdell
1932–1933: Hew Ross
1933–1934: Frank Newton
1934–1935: John Hodder
1935–1936: Arthur Edmonds
1936–1937: John Pinsent
1937–1938: William Richardson
1938–1945: Francis Griffiths
1945–1946: Charles Sankey
1946–1947: Cyril Bones
1947–1949: Doris Crompton
1949–1950: Cyril Taylor
1950–1951: Reginald Evans
1951–1952: Arthur Edmonds
1952–1953: Doris Edmeades
1953–1954: Reginald Dutton
1954–1955: Adelaide Charles  (died in office and replaced by Doris Edmeades)
1955–1956: Barbara Gertrude Thackeray
1956–1957: Major Paul Henry Benson Woodhouse
1957–1958: Evelyn Mary Barnes
1958–1959: Fendall W Harvey Pratt
1959–1960: Margaret E L Lowden
1960–1961: Lt Colonel Donald Charles Spelman
1961–1962: Vera Neate
1962–1963: John Hutchins
1963–1964: Dorothy Richards
1964–1965: Stanley Steel
1965–1966: Cyril Bones
1966–1967: Barbara Carpenter Turner
1967–1968: D Jeffrey Smith
1968–1969: Stewart Green
1969–1970: S E Spicer
1970–1971: Stanley Steel
1971–1972: Alice Cleary
1972–1973: T David Sermon
1973–1974: Cyril Taylor
1974–1975: Barbara Carpenter Turner
1975–1976: Alan Cotterill
1976–1977: Gwendoline Shave
1977–1978: David Ball
1978–1979: John Flook
1979–1980: John Green
1980–1981: M Pamela Pitt
1981–1982: Ian Bidgood
1982–1983: Albert Austen
1983–1984: Frederick Peachey
1984–1985: John Broadway
1985–1986: Jean Freeman
1986–1987: Sue Gentry
1987–1988: Major D Covill 
1988–1989: Commander B Hall 
1989–1990: Frederick Allgood 
1990–1991: Pamela Peskett
1991–1992: Capt Richard Bates
1992–1993: Wing Cdr John Nunn 
1993–1994: Susan Glasspool
1994–1995: Raymond Pearce
1995–1996: Patricia Norris
1996–1997: Brian 'Brandy' Blunt
1997–1998: Norman Hibdige
1998–1999: George Fothergill
1999–2000: Allan Mitchell
2000–2001: Georgina Busher
2001–2002: Therese Evans
2002–2003: John Steel
2003–2004: Jean Hammerton
2004–2005: Cecily Sutton
2005–2006: Neil Baxter
2006–2007: Sue Nelmes
2007–2008: Chris Pines
2008–2009: Michael Read
2009–2010: Dominic Hiscock
2010–2011: Richard Izard
2011–2012: Barry Lipscomb
2012–2013: Frank Pearson
2013–2014: Ernest Jeffs
2014–2015: Eileen Berry
2015–2016: Angela Clear
2016–2017: Jane Rutter 
2017–2018: David McLean
2018–2019: Frank Pearson
2019–2020: Eleanor Bell
2020–2021: Patrick Cunningham
2021–2022: Vivian Achwal
2022–2023: Derek Green

See also
Local Government in the United Kingdom
City of Winchester

References

City of Winchester
History of Winchester
Winchester
Mayor of Winchester